Marin Draganja and Nikola Mektić won the title, beating Dominik Meffert and Oleksandr Nedovyesov 6–4, 3–6, [10–6]

Seeds

Draw

Draw

References

Banja Luka Challenger - Doubles
2013 Doubles
2013 in Bosnia and Herzegovina